Metamicroptera rotundata is a moth of the family Erebidae. It was described by Gustaaf Hulstaert in 1923. It is found in the Democratic Republic of the Congo, Rwanda and Zambia.

References

 

Syntomini
Moths described in 1923
Erebid moths of Africa